Surirella elegans is a species of freshwater diatoms in the family Surirellaceae.

References

External links
 Surirella elegans at AlgaeBase

Surirellales
Species described in 1843